The Table Tennis Competition at the 2009 Mediterranean Games was held in Pescara, Italy.

Men's competition

Men's singles

Men's team

Women's competition

Women's singles

Women's team

Medal table

References
Results

Sports at the 2009 Mediterranean Games
2009
M